United States v. Raines, 362 U.S. 17 (1960), was a United States Supreme Court decision relating to civil rights. The Court overturned the ruling of a U.S. District Court, which had held that a law authorizing the Federal Government to bring civil actions against State Officials for discriminating against African-Americans citizens was unconstitutional.

Attorney General brought suit to enjoin (issue injunction) against Raines and other Georgia public officials from discriminating against African Americans wanting to vote.  District court dismissed the complaint from Raines, et al. because this could be brought by private citizens.

See also
 List of United States Supreme Court cases, volume 362

Further reading

External links
 
 

United States Supreme Court cases
United States Supreme Court cases of the Warren Court
1960 in United States case law
Civil rights movement case law
United States racial discrimination case law